Kenley is a locality located in the Rural City of Swan Hill, Victoria, Australia, which contains the former locality of Piambie. The post office there opened on 1 November 1923 and was closed on 1 March 1967.

References

Towns in Victoria (Australia)
Rural City of Swan Hill